The 2015–16 Angers SCO season is the 97th professional season of the club since its creation in 1919. Angers return to Ligue 1 after finishing third in Ligue 2 last season.

Players 

French teams are limited to four players without EU citizenship. Hence, the squad list includes only the principal nationality of each player; several non-European players on the squad have dual citizenship with an EU country. Also, players from the ACP countries—countries in Africa, the Caribbean, and the Pacific that are signatories to the Cotonou Agreement—are not counted against non-EU quotas due to the Kolpak ruling.

Current squad 

Updated 2 February 2016.

Out on loan

Squad statistics

Transfers

In

Out

Out on loan

Competitions

Ligue 1

League table

Results summary

Results by round

Matches

Coupe de France

Coupe de la Ligue

References

Angers SCO
Angers SCO seasons